During World War II, Project Pigeon (later Project Orcon, for "organic control") was American behaviorist B. F. Skinner's attempt to develop a pigeon-controlled guided bomb.

Overview
The testbed was the same National Bureau of Standards-developed, unpowered airframe that was later used for the US Navy's radar-guided "Bat" glide bomb, which was basically a small glider, with wings and tail surfaces, an explosive warhead section in the center, and a "guidance section" in the nose cone. The intent was to train pigeons to act as "pilots" for the device, using their cognitive abilities to recognize the target. The guidance system consisted of three lenses mounted in the nose of the vehicle, which projected an image of the target on a screen mounted in a small compartment inside the nose cone. This screen was mounted on pivots and fitted with sensors that measured any angular movement.
One to three pigeons, trained by operant conditioning to recognize the target, were stationed in front of the screen; when they saw the target, they would peck at the screen with their beaks. They were trained by being shown an image of the target and each time the pigeons pecked the image some seed would be dispensed.  As long as the target remained in the center of the screen, the screen would not move, but if the bomb began to go off track, the image would move towards the edge of the screen. The pigeons would follow the image, pecking at it, which would move the screen on its pivots.

The sensors would detect the movement and send signals to the control surfaces, which would steer the bomb in the direction the screen had moved. As the bomb swung back towards the target, the pigeons would again follow the image, bringing the screen back to the centered position again. In that way, the pigeons would correct any deviations in the course and keep the bomb on its glide path.

Early electronic guidance systems use similar methods, only with electronic signals and processors replacing the birds in detecting the target and preventing deviation from the glide path.

The National Defense Research Committee saw the idea to use pigeons in glide bombs as very eccentric and impractical, but still contributed $25,000 to the research. Skinner, who had some success with the training, complained: "our problem was no one would take us seriously". The program was canceled on October 8, 1944, because the military believed that "further prosecution of this project would seriously delay others which in the minds of the Division have more immediate promise of combat application".

Project Pigeon was revived by the Navy in 1948 as "Project Orcon"; it was cancelled in 1953 when the reliability of electronic guidance systems was proven.

See also 

 Animal-borne bomb attacks
 Anti-tank dog
 Bat bomb (incendiary ordnance)
 Ethology
 Military animals
 Pigeon intelligence
 War pigeon

References 

 
 C. V. Glines: Top Secret World War II Bat and Bird Bomber Program, Aviation History, May 2005, Vol. 15, Issue 5, p. 38–44.

External links 
 Project Orcon
 National Museum of American History

World War II weapons of the United States
Military animals of World War II
Missile guidance
Psychology experiments
Pigeon Guided Missile
Abandoned military projects of the United States
Columbidae